The Assistant Secretary of Defense for Readiness and Force Management, or ASD(R&FM), is a Defense Department position responsible for civilian and military personnel policy, readiness of the force, military community and family policy and diversity management and equal opportunity.

Its predecessor, the Assistant Secretary of Defense for Force Management Policy, or ASD(FMP), was a high-ranking position in the Defense Department responsible for the policies, plans and programs for military and civilian personnel management, including recruitment, education, career development, equal opportunity, compensation, recognition, discipline and separation of all Department of Defense personnel. The ASD(FMP) reported directly to the Under Secretary of Defense for Personnel and Readiness, or USD(P&R). The ASD(FMP) was replaced in 2002 by a new Deputy Under Secretary position, which is today known as the Principal Deputy Assistant Secretary of Defense for Personnel and Readiness.

History
An Assistant Secretary of Defense was first assigned oversight of DoD manpower, personnel and reserve affairs in 1950. Defense Directive 5124.1, signed 20 April 1977, also delegated oversight of logistics to this position. Following the FY 1984 Defense Authorization Act, the reserve affairs functions were transferred to the new Assistant Secretary of Defense for Reserve Affairs. Meanwhile, installations and logistics functions transferred to a new Assistant Secretary of Defense (Acquisition and Logistics) in July 1985.

From the mid-80s to mid-90s, the position was responsible for military and civilian manpower training, family matters, and review of manpower requirements, both military and civilian, and also exercised direction of equal opportunity matters. After the National Defense Authorization Act for Fiscal Year 1994 (P.L. 103-160) established the Under Secretary of Defense for Personnel and Readiness, this position was redesignated the Assistant Secretary of Defense for Force Management Policy, and served as a staff assistant to the USD(P&R). The position was abolished in November 2002 when the new Deputy Under Secretary of Defense for Personnel and Readiness took office. The portfolio of the former ASD(FMP) is today distributed across a Principal Deputy Assistant Secretary of Defense for Personnel and Readiness (previously known as the Principal Deputy Under Secretary of Defense) and five Deputy Assistant Secretaries of Defense (previously known as Deputy Under Secretaries of Defense).

Office Holders
The table below includes both the various titles of this post over time, as well as all the holders of those offices.

References